Glyphostoma golfoyaquense is a species of sea snail, a marine gastropod mollusk in the family Clathurellidae.

Description
This species occurs in the Gulf of Mexico from West Florida to Yucatan, Mexico.

Distribution
G. golfoyaquense can be found in Caribbean waters, ranging from western Florida to the Yucatan.

References

 Rosenberg, G., F. Moretzsohn, and E. F. García. 2009. Gastropoda (Mollusca) of the Gulf of Mexico, pp. 579–699 in Felder, D.L. and D.K. Camp (eds.), Gulf of Mexico–Origins, Waters, and Biota. Biodiversity. Texas A&M Press, College Station, Texas

golfoyaquense
Gastropods described in 1917